Nilufar Azamova (born 10 March 2004) is an Uzbek rhythmic gymnast, member of the national group.

Personal life 
Nilufar took up rhythmic gymnastics in 2008 in Fergana, after her mother encouraged her to try the sport. Her idol is Russian rhythmic gymnast Aleksandra Soldatova, her dream is to compete at the Olympic Games. She has received the title of Candidate for Master of Sport in Uzbekistan.

Career 
Azamova debuted at the 1st Junior World Championships in Moscow, placing 11th in teams, 17th in the All-Around, 14th with 5 ribbons and 20th in the 5 hoops. 

In 2022 she entered the senior national group, debuting at the World Cup in Tashkent, winning silver in the All-Around and with 5 hoops as well as gold with 3 ribbons and 2 balls. A week later the group competed in Baku, ending 6th in the All-Around, 7th with 5 hoops and 3 ribbons and 2 balls. In June she took part in the World Cup in Pesaro, taking 8th place in the All-Around and 7th with 5 hoops. She was then selected for the Asian Championships in Pattaya, winning gold in teams, the All-Around and with 3 ribbons and 2 balls and silver with 5 hoops. In August Nilufar competed at the 2021 Islamic Solidarity Games in Konya where the group won silver in the All-Around and with 3 ribbons and 2 balls, gold with 5 hoops. In September Azamova took part in the World Championships in Sofia along Khurshidabonu Abduraufova, Nargiza Djumaniyazova, Shakhzoda Ibragimova, Mumtozabonu Iskhokzoda, Mariya Pak, and the two individuals Takhmina Ikromova and Yosmina Rakhimova, taking 18th place in the All-Around, 13th with 5 hoops and 20th with 3 ribbons + 2 balls.

References 

Living people
2004 births
Uzbekistani rhythmic gymnasts